Lágrimas De Sangre is the debut studio album by reggaeton producer and singer Naldo, released on April 28, 2009. The first single from the album is "Ya No Existen Detalles" featuring Jowell & Randy.

Track listing
Official track list:
"Intro"
"Hoy"
"Ya No Existen Detalles" (feat. Jowell & Randy)
"7 Mares"
"De la Noche a la Mañana"
"No Sé Si Tú" (feat. De La Ghetto)
"¿Cómo Te Ha Ido?" (feat. Ivy Queen)
"Universitaria"
"Si Como Camina Cocina" (feat. Dálmata)
"Mínimo" (feat. Yomo
"Una Noche Más"
"Mal" (feat. Keesha)
"Otra Vez" (feat. LJ)
"No He Dormido Na"
"Te Sabe Igual"

Promotional songs 

"Pa' Ti Estoy Ready" (feat. Alex The Greatest)

References

Reggaeton albums
2009 debut albums